Language gene may refer to:
FOXP2, a protein found in mammals
PCDH11Y, a gene unique to human males